Mike Morris (born February 22, 1961) is a former long snapper for the Minnesota Vikings, a former radio host on KFAN in Minneapolis, and Strength and Conditioning Coach for Concordia University (Saint Paul).

Playing career 
Morris was a four-year starter at Northeast Missouri State, and entered the National Football League as an undrafted free agent. He played brief stints for the St. Louis/Phoenix Cardinals, the Kansas City Chiefs, the New England Patriots, the Seattle Seahawks, and the Cleveland Browns before settling in as the long snapper for the Minnesota Vikings, where he played at a high level consistently throughout the 1990s.

Broadcasting 
Following the end of his football career, Morris took over the morning drive time slot on sports radio station KFAN. Morris broadcast using the moniker 'Superstar Mike Morris.' His show was known as The Power Trip Morning Show, and every show had a common theme ending with a tribute to a particular soldier and a thanks to the soldiers of the US armed forces. 'The Power Trip Morning Show' continues to air as of July 2020 with other local personalities (and no longer features the traditional ending). Morris was also the co-host of Vikings Fanline, adding his thoughts (as a former NFL player) after games, often including banter and strong opinions with live callers over the radio airwaves.

In 2001, Morris was offered the position of Minnesota Vikings radio play by play announcer by KFAN after Lee Hamilton was fired after one preseason game. Morris's hiring, however, was vetoed by the Vikings & the job was given to Terry Stembridge, Jr.

On September 9, 2013, Morris and co-host Bob Sansevere started "Mike & Bob Afternoons" on WGVX 105 The Ticket. Sansevere later got his own time slot, Morris teamed with co-host Ben Holsen on a new show called "Radioactive Sports". The format for both shows was Minnesota sports talk. 105 The Ticket later changed its format thus eliminating all local programming and ending Radioactive Sports.

Morris currently appears on ESPN1500 in Minneapolis during the Mackey & Judd show. He is generally on Mondays and Fridays, and also hosts Viking Ventline for the station. Morris is the owner of a physical conditioning studio in Burnsville, Minnesota, the "MILO Barbell Company". He was released from the station as part of broader layoffs in August 2018.

Personal 
Morris is married to singer-songwriter and radio personality Keri Noble who has 11 plus albums to her credit.

He is known as "Superstar Mike Morris", a nickname inspired by professional wrestler "Superstar" Billy Graham, whom Morris admired in his younger days. The moniker was given by teammates and friends to Morris, referring to the impressive muscular physique both had in common in the prime of their respective careers. Both 'Superstar' athletes put in many hours lifting weights & heavy training. The reference also pertained to the colorful personalities, abilities on a microphone, love for music, sports cars & the tie dye shirts both men often wore.

See also

 Career Statistics
 Power Trip Morning Show
 Concordia University, St.Paul

References 

1961 births
Living people
People from Centerville, Iowa
Players of American football from Iowa
American football long snappers
Truman Bulldogs football players
St. Louis Cardinals (football) players
Kansas City Chiefs players
New England Patriots players
Cleveland Browns players
Seattle Seahawks players
Minnesota Vikings players
American radio personalities